3099 Hergenrother, provisional designation , is an asteroid from the outer region of the asteroid belt, approximately 15 kilometers in diameter. It was discovered on 3 April 1940, by Finnish astronomer Yrjö Väisälä at Turku Observatory in Southwest Finland, and named after American astronomer Carl Hergenrother in 1996.

Orbit and classification 

Hergenrother orbits the Sun in the outer main-belt at a distance of 2.3–3.5 AU once every 4 years and 11 months (1,786 days). Its orbit has an eccentricity of 0.20 and an inclination of 15° with respect to the ecliptic. The body's observation arc begins 6 days after its official discovery observation at Turku.

Physical characteristics

Rotation period 

In January 2008, a rotational lightcurve of Hergenrother was obtained from photometric observations by French amateur astronomer Pierre Antonini. Lightcurve analysis gave a rotation period of 24.266 hours with a brightness variation of 0.28 magnitude.

Diameter and albedo 

According to the survey carried out by NASA's Wide-field Infrared Survey Explorer with its subsequent NEOWISE mission, Hergenrother measures 14.73 kilometers in diameter and its surface has an albedo of 0.224, while the Collaborative Asteroid Lightcurve Link assumes a standard albedo for carbonaceous asteroids of 0.057 and consequently calculates a diameter of 29.21 kilometers, as the lower the albedo, the larger the body's diameter at a certain absolute magnitude.

Naming 

This minor planet was named in honor of American astronomer Carl W. Hergenrother (born 1973). At Lunar and Planetary Laboratory, he has been a discoverer of minor planets with high inclinations during the Bigelow Sky Survey, precursor to the Catalina Sky Survey. The naming was proposed by MPC director Brian G. Marsden among others. The official naming citation was published by the Minor Planet Center on 3 May 1996.

References

External links 
 Get to Know a Staff Scientist: Carl Hergenrother, Lunar & Planetary Laboratory, University of Arizona
 Asteroid Lightcurve Database (LCDB), query form (info )
 Dictionary of Minor Planet Names, Google books
 Asteroids and comets rotation curves, CdR – Observatoire de Genève, Raoul Behrend
 Discovery Circumstances: Numbered Minor Planets (1)-(5000) – Minor Planet Center
 
 

003099
Discoveries by Yrjö Väisälä
Named minor planets
19400403